Bestfly Cabo Verde (legally, and previously doing business as, TICV - Transportes Interilhas de Cabo Verde) is a scheduled and charter, passenger and cargo airline based in Praia, Cape Verde. It operates inter-island services. Its main base is Nelson Mandela International Airport. The company was founded in 2015 as Binter Cabo Verde.

History

The airline was founded in 2015 as Binter Cabo Verde, a subsidiary of Spanish airline Binter Canarias. Operations commenced on 12 November 2016 with flights connecting the islands of Santiago, Sal and São Vicente. Binter Cabo Verde took over inter-island flights after TACV discontinued its domestic operations on 1 August 2017 due to restructuring and privatisation.

In August 2019, the airline changed its name from Binter Cabo Verde (Binter CV) to Transportes Interilhas de Cabo Verde (TICV). Binter Canarias divested in the airline in June 2021, selling its majority 70% stake to Angolan airline BestFly Worldwide with the remaining 30% owned by the Government of Cape Verde. The company has since rebranded the airline as Bestfly Cabo Verde.

Destinations
As of July 2022, Bestfly Cabo Verde flies to all seven Cape Verde airports.

Current fleet
As of July 2022, the Bestfly Cabo Verde fleet consists of the following aircraft:

See also
Binter Canarias

References

External links

Official website

2014 establishments in Cape Verde
Airlines established in 2014
Airlines of Cape Verde
Companies based in Praia